Sieglinde  is a Germanic feminine given name. It is derived from two German words or elements. Those being: "sigu" for victory and "lind" for soft, tender, flexible. The diminutive version is "Sigi" or "Siggie".

It is also seen in German mythology. In the saga Nibelungenlied, Sieglinde was the mother of Siegfried.

Those with the name may refer to:

 Erda Sieglinde Walsh (born 1952), German-born Canadian politician
 Sieglinde Ahrens (born 1936), German organist and composer
 Sieglinde Ammann (born 1946), Swiss Olympic pentathlete
 Sieglinde Cadusch (born 1967), Swiss high jumper
 Sieglinde Gstöhl (born 1964), writer from Liechtenstein 
 Sieglinde Hartmann (born 1954), German medievalist
 Sieglinde Hofmann (born 1945), German militant
 Sieglinde Wagner (1921–2003), Austrian operatic contralto

Fictional characters 
 Signy, the name of two heroines in two connected legends from Scandinavian mythology
 Sieglinde, a central character in Die Walküre, the second opera of Richard Wagner's Ring cycle
 Sieglinde Sullivan (born 1877), character from the manga and anime Black Butler

See also
Sieglinde (decoy), a sonar decoy used during the Second World War by German U-boats
Zelinda (Italian form)

References

Feminine given names
German feminine given names
Names of Germanic origin